Lepi Vrh is a small settlement northeast of Velike Bloke in the Municipality of Bloke in the Inner Carniola region of Slovenia.

References

External links
Lepi Vrh on Geopedia

Populated places in the Municipality of Bloke